TV show may refer to:

 television program, a broadcast segment on television
 TV Show (album), a 2007 music recording by Russian singer Sergey Lazarev WWE

See also
 Lists of television programs